Janet Biggs is an American artist, known for her work in video, photography and performance art. Biggs lives and works in New York City.

Biggs' work focuses on individuals in extreme landscapes or situations and often navigates territory between art and science. Often working in collaborations with neuroscientists, aerospace engineers, astrophysicists and robots, her work draws connections between physical terrains and psychological, societal, or political dynamics.

In her videos, Biggs focuses on individuals in extreme landscapes, such as the Taklamakan desert of Western China, the Horn of Africa, the Arctic, and the Mars Desert Research station. Her work explores challenges faced by diverse groups including the Uighurs, Indonesian sulfur miners and Yemini refugees. She has captured such events as kayaks performing a synchronized ballet in Arctic waters and a NASCAR pit crew's grace struggle to service a racecar.

Biggs’ work has taken her into areas of conflict in the Horn of Africa and to Mars (as a crew member at the Mars Desert Research Station). She has collaborated with neuroscientists, Arctic explorers, aerospace engineers, astrophysicists, miners, Yemeni refugees, and a robot. Her earlier video work dealt with issues of psychosis and psychotropic drugs.

Biggs was awarded a Guggenheim Fellowship for Fine Arts in 2018.

Recent work
Biggs' work will be presented at the 2021 Armory Show, Javits Center, New York City, from 9–12 September 2021. Her work will be shown at a featured solo booth as part of “Focus,” a curatorial initiative curated by Wassan Al-Khudhairi.

In addition to videos, Biggs' recent work includes multi-discipline performances, often including multiple large-scale videos, live musicians, artificial intelligence, paraplegics and athletes. Her newest work incorporates footage shot by Biggs at refugee camps in Djibouti, in Ethiopian badlands, and at Mars simulations in Utah and the Himalayas. She has recently trained in space medicine, equestrian vaulting and arctic kayaking.

On April 8, 2021 Janet Biggs presented a livestream performance, "Singular Value Decomposition," emerging from a collaboration between Arts at CERN, the official arts program of the European Organization for Nuclear Research (CERN) and the Integrated Arts Research Initiative (IARI) at the Spencer Museum of Art at the University of Kansas (KU).

On 30 July 2020, Biggs created an experimental live online performance at Fridman Gallery in New York City. While Biggs directed remotely, singer and dancer Mary Esther Carter performed, accompanied by an Artificial intelligence entity named A.I. Anne, which was created by composer and music technologist Richard Savery.  Also in July 2020, the Boca Raton Museum of Art presented a new installation by Biggs, "Solitary Acts."

In June 2019, Biggs presented 'Overview Effect', an exhibition of new video work, at the Cristin Tierney Gallery in New York City.
 As part of this exhibition, Biggs' premiered "How the Light Gets In," a multi-media performance, at the Theater at the New Museum.

In December, 2018, Biggs had solo exhibitions and film screenings at the Museo de la Naturaleza y el Hombre and the Museum of Science and the Cosmos in the Canary Islands.
In May 2018, Biggs was included in "Shots Across the Plane," at the Zurab Tsereteli Museum of Modern Art in Tbilisi, Georgia.

In 2017, the Neuberger Museum of Art (Purchase, New York) presented "A Step on the Sun."
 
In addition, Biggs' work has recently been presented in shows at the Tasmanian Museum and Art Gallery (June, 2018), the 17º Festival Internacional de la Imagen (group exhibition as part of art + tech festival) in Manizales Colombia, "Art & Coal" (Kunst & Kohle), a group exhibition spanning 17 museums in the Ruhr Valley), at the Skulpturenmuseum Glaskasten Marl in Marl, Germany, "For a gentle song would not shake us if we had never heard a loud one" at the Fotografisk Center, Copenhagen, Denmark. and "Videos for a Stadium" at the University of Kentucky Art Museum (screening at the Commonwealth Stadium at University of Kentucky) Lexington, KY.
 
Biggs was selected to be on Crew 181 of the Mars Desert Research Station, and has incorporated elements of space exploration in her latest work.

Exhibitions and screenings
Biggs has recently been presented in solo shows and screenings at Cristin Tierney Gallery in New York City, Connersmith Gallery in Washington, DC, Barbara Polla's Analix Forever Gallery in Geneva, Smack Mellon in Brooklyn NY, and Galerie Anita Beckers in Frankfurt Germany.

In June 2017, at David Lynch's Club Silencio in Paris, Biggs presented a premier of her performance piece, "Far From Home," which incorporated a live musical performance by Rhys Chatham and a reading by Frank Smith with video of her recent work in a Yemeni refugee camp in Djibouti and at the Mars Desert Research Station.

In 2015, the Blaffer Art Museum in Houston, Texas, presented Biggs' Echo of the Unknown, a multidimensional exhibition combining video, sound, and objects that explore the role of memory in the construction of identity. Drawing from her personal memories of the effects of Alzheimer’s on family members, heroic stories of public figures coping with the disease, and research conducted with neurologists and geoscientists, Biggs raises fundamental questions about how we become–and how we lose our sense of–who we are.  In conjunction with Echo of the Unknown, Blaffer collaborated with more than a dozen UH colleges and Houston institutions on the Blaffer Art Museum Innovation Series, an ambitious slate of lectures, gallery talks and panel discussions, enhancing the exhibition’s role as a catalyst for cross-disciplinary learning.

In 2014 Biggs was exhibited in the First International Biennial of Contemporary Art of Cartagena de Indias.

The Tampa Museum of Art presented a survey of Biggs' work in 2011. Biggs' video work has also been shown in solo exhibitions at Musée d'art contemporain de Montréal, Glaskasten Marl Sculpture Museum (Marl, Germany), the Mint Museum (Charlotte NC), the Gibbes Museum of Art (Charlotte, NC), the McNay Museum (San Antonio, Texas), the Herbert F. Johnson Museum of Art (Ithaca, NY), Videonale 13 (Bonn, Germany) and the Perth Institute of Contemporary Arts.  In 2012, Biggs' Arctic Trilogy was screened as part of the Environmental Film Festival at the Hirshhorn Museum and Sculpture Garden (Washington, DC),

Biggs travelled to the far Arctic in 2009-2010, where she captured images of individuals' interaction with extremes environments above and below the ice. Biggs used this footage to create three videos, "The Arctic Trilogy." These videos were premiered at Ed Winkleman Gallery in Chelsea (New York City) in February 2011. This show was reviewed in the New York Times by Holland Carter.

On July 14, 2009, Vanishing Point was screened at New York's River To River Festival. That same evening, Biggs' videos accompanied an ambient performance by Anthony Gonzalez of the band M83.

Recognition
Biggs was awarded a Guggenheim Fellowship for Fine Arts in 2018.

In 2016, Biggs was selected by Lynn Hershman Leeson as part of ArtReview magazine's "Future Greats - the artists to look out for in 2016." Also in 2016, Biggs was named a Distinguished Alumni at Moore College of Art and Design.

The October 2015 Art In America featured an article written by Faye Hirsch on Biggs' work, with a focus on the Blaffer exhibition.

ArtNew's April 2015 cover article "Art Made in Harm's Way" by Lily Wei featured Biggs' travels to Ethiopia's border conflict, where she filmed local Afar militia as they patrolled the Ethiopian/Eritrean border.

In 2013 Biggs was awarded a la Napoule Art Foundation Riviera Residency, and in 2009 and 2010 she was selected for The Arctic Circle High Arctic Expedition residency. She received an Art Matters Project grant in 2010. Janet Biggs was a recipient of a New York State Council on the Arts grant in 2011 and 2009 through the New York Experimental Television Center. She has received additional funding grants from Art Matters, the Arts and Science Council of Charlotte, and the Goodrich Foundation. In 2004 she received the Anonymous Was a Woman fellowship, and received a painting fellowship from the National Endowment for the Arts in 1989.

Contemporary Magazine profiled Biggs in their March 2007 issue, and one of her photographs was used as the cover of Spot magazine's Summer 2007 issue.

Commercial work
Biggs was commissioned by Puma to create a short film as part of their 2012 Films4Peace initiative.

In 2006, Hermès commissioned Biggs to create a work of art for their flagship New York store. Biggs installed 11 large monitors in the store's Madison Avenue windows, as well as photographs of equestrian-themed images.

Collections
Her work is in the permanent collections of La Collezione Videoinsight®, Turin, Italy; Fonds Régional d'Art Contemporain (FRAC), Languedoc-Roussillon, France; Skulpturenmuseum Glaskasten Marl (Ruhr Kunst Museen), Marl, Germany; the Tampa Museum of Art; the Gibbes Museum of Art, Charleston, South Carolina; the High Museum of Art in Atlanta; the Mint Museum of Art,
 Charlotte; the Herbert F. Johnson Museum of Art, Cornell University, Ithaca; and The New Britain Museum of American Art, New Britain, Connecticut.

Representation
Biggs works with Cristin Tierney Gallery, New York City, CONNERSMITH (Washington, DC), Analix Forever (Geneva, Switzerland), and Galerie Anita Beckers/blink video (Frankfurt, Germany).

Selected bibliography
Reviews of Biggs' work have appeared in the New York Times, the New Yorker, ArtForum, ARTNews, Art in America, Flash Art, Artnet.com, and many others.
Wei, Lily: "Janet Biggs: Like Walking on Mars." Studio International, December 20, 2018. 
ArtReview's "Future Greats – the artists to look out for in 2016." Selected by Lynn Hershman Leeson. ArtReview Vol. 68, No. 1, January/February 2016, pages 88-89.
Gleeson, Bridget: "Janet Biggs Investigates Survival through an Innovative Two-Channel Video." Artsy.com, 30 November 2016.
Hirsh, Faye: A Crystal Grotto. Art in America, October 2015
Wei, Lily: "Art Made in Harm's Way." Artnews, April 2015, page 42.
Peiffer, Prudence: Janet Biggs. Artforum, 09 February 2015.
Jenkins, Mark: Janet Biggs Creates an Active Art Experience With Kawah Ijen, Washington Post, 26 April 2012
Pollack, Barbara: Janet Biggs. Art in America, May 2011.
Carter, Holland: Review of show at Ed Winkleman Gallery. The New York Times, 17 February 2011.
Jeppesen, Travis: Janet Biggs at Mint Museum, Charlotte. Artforum, January 2011.
Pollack, Barbara: Janet Biggs at Conner Contemporary Art, Washington, DC. ARTnews, November 2010.
Wennerstrom, Nord: Janet Biggs at Conner Contemporary Art, Washington, DC. Artforum, October 2010.
Byrd, Cathy: "Janet Biggs." Contemporary, March, 2007.
Matsumae, Ayano: "Janet Biggs" (review of Behind the Vertical at Hermés, New York ).  Nileport Magazine (Japan). November, 2006.
Dunning, Jennifer: "A Horse and Dancers in an Ode to Interspecies Ties." New York Times, 10 October 2005.

References

External links
jbiggs.com - Janet Biggs' web site
Janet Biggs at Cristin Tierney Gallery
vimeo.com/jbiggs- Janet Biggs on Vimeo
CONNERSMITH Gallery (Washington, DC)
Gallery Anita Beckers - Blink Video (Frankfurt, Germany)

1959 births
Living people
American video artists
American women performance artists
American performance artists
American women video artists
Artists from New York (state)
Moore College of Art and Design alumni
20th-century American photographers
21st-century American photographers
20th-century American women photographers
21st-century American women photographers